Jacques Lataste (7 June 1922 – 10 November 2011) was a French fencer. He won two gold medals and a silver in the team foil event at three different Olympics.

Olympic success
 Gold medal in the team foil at Summer Olympics in 1948 alongside Adrien Rommel, Andre Bonnin, Christian d'Oriola, Jehan Buhan and Rene Bougnol.
 Gold medal in the team foil at Summer Olympics in 1952 alongside Adrien Rommel, Christian d'Oriola, Claude Nette, Jacques Christmas and Jehan Buhan.
 Silver medal in the team foil to Summer Olympics of 1956.

References

External links
 

1922 births
2011 deaths
French male foil fencers
Olympic fencers of France
Fencers at the 1948 Summer Olympics
Fencers at the 1952 Summer Olympics
Fencers at the 1956 Summer Olympics
Olympic gold medalists for France
Olympic silver medalists for France
Olympic medalists in fencing
Medalists at the 1948 Summer Olympics
Medalists at the 1952 Summer Olympics
Medalists at the 1956 Summer Olympics
Sportspeople from Gard
20th-century French people